Eşref Vaiz is a minister in the 20th Government of the Turkish Republic of Northern Cyprus, under Prime Minister Ferdi Sabit Soyer.  His portfolios are Health and Social welfare.  He was confirmed as a government minister in April 2005.

References

External links
 North Cyprus Government profile

Living people
Year of birth missing (living people)
Government ministers of Northern Cyprus